Soviet cruiser Slava may refer to:

Soviet cruiser Slava (1939), formerly Soviet cruiser Molotov
Soviet cruiser Slava (1979), former name of Russian cruiser Moskva